The 2022 bombing of Ivano-Frankivsk began on the first day of Russia's invasion of Ukraine with a series of missile strikes by Russia and Belarus.

Course of events

February 
On February 24, Russian troops launched a missile attack on the military airfield in Ivano-Frankivsk, as a result of which a warehouse with fuel and lubricants caught fire.  According to the data provided by military personnel, 1 person died.  At the same time, Russian troops launched a missile attack on the military airfield in the village of Kornych and the Kolomyia district, where, according to preliminary data, 3 servicemen and 2 civilian employees of the airfield were wounded.

March 
On March 11, Russian forces launched a missile attack on the civilian airport of Ivano-Frankivsk, and during the attack, the air-raid siren did not go off.  As a result of shelling, the infrastructure of the airport was significantly damaged.  According to preliminary data, there were no casualties during this shelling.  The Mayor of Ivano-Frankivsk, Ruslan Martsinkiv, recommended to residents of the city who live near the airport to move to a safer place during the war, as there is a possibility of repeated shelling of the city.

On March 13, Russian troops shelled Ivano-Frankivsk for the third time, the city's airport was hit again, as a result of which its infrastructure was almost completely destroyed. The strike was carried out at 6:30 a.m., just after the end of the nationwide air alert.  According to the authorities of the city and region, there were no casualties this time either.

According to the report of Lviv City Council member Andrian Gutnyk, published on April 18, 2022, the missile attack on Lviv, which took place on March 18, 2022, was initially planned for Ivano-Frankivsk, and only at the last moment were the missiles returned to Lviv.

May 
On May 5, the mayor of Ivano-Frankivsk, Ruslan Martsinkiv, said that he had received information about a possible rocket attack on the city in the period from May 7 to 9, so the mayor called on the city's residents to leave its borders for these three days.  however, this information was not confirmed later, and there was no rocket attack on the city during those days.

October 
On October 19, Russian troops launched a missile attack on Burshtyn TPP.  4 missiles hit, no one was injured.

References 

Airstrikes during the 2022 Russian invasion of Ukraine
Attacks on buildings and structures in Ukraine
Ivano-Frankivsk